The Burdens of Being Upright is the debut studio album by American singer-songwriter Tracy Bonham, released on March 19, 1996 by Island Records.

Content

The Burdens of Being Upright was recorded in the summer of 1995 at Fort Apache Studios in Cambridge, Massachusetts. Referencing this album, in 2015 Bonham said, The album cover (a reference to German photographer August Sander's work "The Bricklayer") was photographed by George DuBose, who was the in-house photographer at the hip hop label Cold Chillin' Records.

Commercial performance 
The Burdens of Being Upright debuted at number 136 on the Billboard 200 chart dated April 27, 1996, and later reached its peak position of number 54 on the chart on June 15, 1996. It remained on the chart for 25 weeks. On November 12, 1996, the album was certified Gold by the Recording Industry Association of America (RIAA), signifying the shipment of 500,000 copies of the album.

Track listing

Personnel
Credits adapted from the album's liner notes.
Tracy Bonham – guitar, violin, vocals
Ed Ackerson – guitar
Fred Eltringham – drums
Josh Freese – drums
Drew Parsons – bass guitar
Eric Paul – drums
Sean Slade – organ, production, engineer
Paul Q. Kolderie – production, engineer

Charts

Certifications

Awards
Grammy Award Nominations

References

External links

Tracy Bonham albums
1996 debut albums
Albums produced by Sean Slade
Albums produced by Paul Q. Kolderie